Brett Ellen Block (born 1973 in Summit, New Jersey) is an American novelist and short story writer.

Life
Block was born and raised in Summit, New Jersey. She received her undergraduate degree in Fine Arts from the University of Michigan, where she was awarded the Hopwood and Haugh Prizes for Fiction Writing.  She went on to earn graduate degrees at the Iowa Writers’ Workshop and the University of East Anglia’s Fiction Writing Program.

Her debut collection of short stories, "Destination Known," won the Drue Heinz Literary Prize, and she is a recipient of the Michener-Copernicus Fellowship.  She is also the author of the critically acclaimed novel The Grave of God’s Daughter and the Macavity Award-nominated thriller The Lightning Rule 

Writing under the name "Ellen Block" she penned the novel The Language of Sand and its sequel, The Definition of Wind.

She lives in Los Angeles.

Awards
2001 Drue Heinz Literature Prize, for Destination Known
2003 Michener-Copernicus Fellowship

Works

Short stories

Mystery
 
   (Paperbacks)

References

External links
Official website

Living people
Alumni of the University of East Anglia
American women short story writers
American short story writers
Writers from Summit, New Jersey
University of Michigan College of Literature, Science, and the Arts alumni
Iowa Writers' Workshop alumni
Hopwood Award winners
1973 births
21st-century American women